Ali Gholizadeh Nojedeh (born 10 March 1996) is an Iranian professional footballer who plays as a forward for Süper Lig club Kasımpaşa, on loan from Belgian First Division A club Charleroi, and the Iran national team.

Gholizadeh is a product of the Saipa youth system and broke into the club's first team at 18. He went on to play for five seasons at Saipa, before transferring to Belgian side Charleroi in 2018. He has represented Iran at every level, making his debut for the senior national team in March 2018 under then head coach Carlos Queiroz.

Club career

Saipa
He started his career with Saipa youth levels. He was promoted to first team by Engin Firat and made his debut for Saipa in last fixture of 2013–14 Iran Pro League against Saba Qom as a substitute. After scoring six times in 28 games, Gholizadeh was named the Persian Gulf Pro League Young Player of the Season for 2017–18.

Charleroi
On 30 May 2018, Gholizadeh joined  Belgian First Division A club Charleroi, joining compatriot Omid Noorafkan. Gholizadeh scored his first goal for the club on 25 November 2018 in a league match against Lokeren. In January 2020, Gholizadeh extended his contract with Charleroi until June 2024.

Loan to Kasımpaşa
On 2 February 2023, Gholizadeh was loaned to Kasımpaşa in Turkey, with an option to buy.

International career

Youth
Gholizadeh was part of Iran U17 in 2012 AFC U-16 Championship and 2013 FIFA U-17 World Cup. He invited to Iran U20 by Ali Dousti Mehr to preparation for 2014 AFC U-19 Championship.

Senior

He made his debut for Team Melli on 17 March 2018 against Sierra Leone and scored two goals. In May 2018 he was named in Iran's preliminary squad for the 2018 World Cup in Russia. In November 2022, he was named by Carlos Queiroz in Iran’s final squad which would compete for the 2022 World Cup in Qatar.

Career statistics

Club

International

International goals
Scores and results list Iran's goal tally first.

Honours
Individual
Iranian Young Player of the Year: 2017–18

Personal life
Gholizadeh married fellow Iranian footballer Yasaman Farmani in February 2019. Farmani also plays for Charleroi, representing the club in the Belgian Women's Super League and has represented the Iranian national team.

References

External links
 ALI GHOLIZADEH JOINS SC CHARLEROI
 Ali Gholizadeh at Persian League
 Ali Gholizadeh at FFIRI

1996 births
People from Namin, Ardabil
Living people
Iranian footballers
Iran under-20 international footballers
Iran international footballers
Association football forwards
Saipa F.C. players
R. Charleroi S.C. players
Kasımpaşa S.K. footballers
Persian Gulf Pro League players
Belgian Pro League players
Süper Lig players
2022 FIFA World Cup players
Iranian expatriate footballers
Expatriate footballers in Belgium
Iranian expatriate sportspeople in Belgium
Expatriate footballers in Turkey
Iranian expatriate sportspeople in Turkey